Euonymus  is a genus of flowering plants in the staff vine family, Celastraceae. Common names vary widely among different species and between different English-speaking countries, but include spindle (or spindle tree), burning-bush, strawberry-bush, wahoo, wintercreeper, or simply euonymus. It comprises about 130 species of deciduous and evergreen shrubs, small trees and lianas. They are mostly native to East Asia, extending to the Himalayas, and they are also distributed in Europe, Australasia, North America, and Madagascar. 50 species are endemic to China.

Description
 
The inconspicuous flowers occur in small groups, and can be green, yellow, pink or maroon in color depending on species.  The leaves are opposite (rarely alternate) and simple ovoid, typically 2–15 cm long, and usually with a finely serrated margin. The fruit is a pink or white four- or five-valved pod-like berry, which splits open to reveal the fleshy-coated orange or red seeds.

The seeds are eaten by frugivorous birds, which digest the fleshy seed coat and disperse the seeds in their droppings.  Many species are used for medicinal use, and parts of the plants can be poisonous to humans.

Cultivation and uses

The wood of some species was traditionally used for the making of spindles for spinning wool; this use is the origin of the British English name of the shrubs.

Euonymus are popular garden shrubs, grown for their foliage, the deciduous species often exhibiting very bright red autumnal colours, and also for the decorative berries. However, Euonymus alatus (winged euonymus or burning-bush) is considered an invasive species in the woodlands of the northeastern United States.

Diversity

Species include:

References

 
Celastrales genera